A paraumbilical (or umbilical) hernia is a hole in the connective tissue of the abdominal wall in the midline with close approximation to the umbilicus. If the hole is large enough there can be protrusion of the abdominal contents, including omental fat and/or bowel. These defects are usually congenital and are not noticed until they slowly enlarge over an individual's life time and abdominal contents herniate through the hole creating either pain or a visible lump on the abdominal wall. If abdominal contents get incarcerated (or stuck) in the hole this can cause pain. If the abdominal contents become strangulated by losing their blood supply from pinching or twisting those tissue will die. If it is omental fat this will cause pain and could potentially lead to an infection. If the strangulated contents are bowel then in addition to pain the individual will develop a bowel obstruction. And if the dead bowel is not surgically removed in an emergent fashion the condition could be fatal.

Treatment

There is no medical treatment to cure a hernia. It requires surgical intervention which involves closing the hole. If the hole is very small this can sometimes be accomplished by simply reapproximating the connective tissue. However for best long term success most hernias require a permanent barrier to cover the defect much like repairing a hole in a tire. This material is commonly referred to as mesh and can be made of different substances depending on the brand.

The operation is usually performed under a general anaesthetic.

In most cases this is done as a day case without the need for an overnight stay.

References

External links 

Hernias